Harold Lane (July 1, 1954) is a Democratic politician, and a former member of the Kansas House of Representatives, representing the 58th district. He was initially appointed to finish the term of Rocky Nichols in 2003. Lane retired from the House on October 31, 2015.

Career
Lane, along with his wife Jane, owned and operated Lane's Barbecue. They have two children, Dan and Laurie, and five grandchildren Ava, Ryan, Adam, Aaron, and Autumn.

He has worked with a number of community organizations, including the Helping Hands Capitol Improvement Board, YMCA Board, Historic Topeka Board, and the Friends of Free State.

On October 11, 2015, Lane posted to his Facebook account announcing his retirement effective October 31, 2015.

Committee memberships
 Appropriations
 Federal and State Affairs
 Education Budget (Ranking Member)
 Joint Committee on Information Technology
 Select Committee on KPERS

Major donors
The top 5 donors to Lane's 2008 campaign:
1. Kansas Contractors Assoc 	$1,000 	
2. Kansans for Lifesaving Cures 	$750 	
3. Kansas National Education Assoc 	$750
4. Kansas Optometric Assoc 	$700 	
5. Northeast KS Building & Construction Trades Council PAC 	$500

References

External links
 Kansas Legislature - Harold Lane
 Project Vote Smart profile
 Kansas Votes profile
 Campaign contributions: 2004, 2006, 2008

Democratic Party members of the Kansas House of Representatives
Living people
1954 births
21st-century American politicians